American Shipping Company ASA, formerly known as Aker American Shipping ASA, is a Norwegian-American shipping and shipyard company and part of the Aker Group. Aker ASA originally owned 53.2% of the company, and in 2008 reduced its ownership share to 19.9%. The company is listed on the Oslo Stock Exchange and is headquartered in Oslo, Norway. It was reported in November 2007 that the company has approximately 1,300 employees.

Aker American Shipping consists of the shipyard, Aker Philadelphia Shipyard, and the shipping company, American Shipping Corporation (ASC). Aker American Shipping builds merchant vessels for companies operating under the Jones Act, and through its subsidiaries, owns and leases those ships as well.

The Jones Act requires all water transport between US ports to be operated by US-flag ships and requires US-flag ships to be built in US shipyards, owned by US citizens, and operated by an American crew.

History

Aker Philadelphia Shipyard, originally Kværner Philadelphia Shipyard, began as a product of a partnership of public and private investments used to rebuild and convert  of the former Philadelphia Naval Shipyard, which was closed in 1995. After the acquisition of Kværner, Aker took ownership of the yard.

In 2006, Aker Philadelphia Shipyard delivered the final vessel in a four-ship series of containerships to Matson Navigation Company. With that, the yard transitioned to building a series of Veteran Class MT46 double-hulled product tankers for bareboat charter to Overseas Shipholding Group, a build program that extends into 2012.

Fleet
 Overseas Houston
 Overseas Long Beach
 Overseas Los Angeles
 Overseas New York
 Overseas Texas City

References

External links
 Official Website
 Movers Scarsdale NY Ltd
 Aker Philadelphia - Website of Aker Philadelphia Shipyard
 

Aker ASA
Shipbuilding companies of Norway
Shipbuilding companies of the United States
Shipping companies of Norway
Shipping companies of the United States
Multinational companies headquartered in Norway
Manufacturing companies based in Philadelphia
Companies based in Oslo
Manufacturing companies established in 1996
Transport companies established in 1996
1996 establishments in Norway
American companies established in 1996